Tieschen is a municipality in the district of Südoststeiermark in the Austrian state of Styria.

Population

See also
 Jörgen

References

Cities and towns in Südoststeiermark District